.wf is the Internet country code top-level domain (ccTLD) for the Wallis and Futuna Islands. This top-level domain is run by the AFNIC and registrations are open to all.

See also 
 Internet in France
 ISO 3166-2:WF
 .fr – ccTLD for France
 .eu – ccTLD for the European Union

References

External links
 IANA .wf whois information
 .wf official website

Country code top-level domains
Communications in Wallis and Futuna
Council of European National Top Level Domain Registries members

sv:Toppdomän#W